Jerzy Wojnecki (11 May 1975 – 3 October 2009) was a Polish football defender.

References

1975 births
2009 deaths
Polish footballers
Sandecja Nowy Sącz players
Hutnik Nowa Huta players
Legia Warsaw players
Zagłębie Lubin players
Wisła Płock players
Świt Nowy Dwór Mazowiecki players
Arka Gdynia players
Tur Turek players
Kujawiak Włocławek players
Association football defenders